Şekerbey can refer to:

 Şəkərbəy
 Şekerbey, Çorum